Patrick Okonkwo (born April 23, 1998) is a Nigerian footballer who currently plays for Cosmos Koblenz in the Rheinlandliga.

Early life 
Okonkwo was born in Lagos, Nigeria and raised by his Aunt and Uncle, before moving to Jamaica and later to the United States where he was adopted by a family in Suwanee, Georgia in 2013.

Professional career 
On June 17, 2017 it was announced that Okonkwo would sign with Major League Soccer side Atlanta United as a Home Grown Player at the beginning of the 2018 season.

In August 2017, Okonkwo signed with United Soccer League side Charleston Battery, the USL affiliate of Atlanta United and a club he'd spent time with in 2016, until the end of their 2018 season. While on loan from Atlanta United, Okonkwo scored six goals for the Charleston Battery during the club's 2018 campaign.

Okonkwo was waived by Atlanta at the end of their 2019 season.

On September 10, 2020, Okonkwo joined USL League One side Chattanooga Red Wolves SC.

References

External links

1998 births
Living people
Nigerian footballers
Association football forwards
Charleston Battery players
Atlanta United FC players
USL Championship players
Atlanta United 2 players
Homegrown Players (MLS)
Chattanooga Red Wolves SC players
United Premier Soccer League players